The Columbia Hydroelectric Station is a hydroelectric station in Columbia, Tennessee, United States.

History
The construction of the hydroelectric station was completed in 1925. It was designed by Freeland, Roberts and Co. and built by Foster & Creighton for the Southern Cities Corporation.

It has been listed on the National Register of Historic Places since February 9, 1990.

References

Industrial buildings and structures on the National Register of Historic Places in Tennessee
Buildings and structures completed in 1925
Buildings and structures in Columbia, Tennessee
1925 establishments in Tennessee
Former hydroelectric power plants in the United States
National Register of Historic Places in Maury County, Tennessee
Energy infrastructure on the National Register of Historic Places
Former power stations in Tennessee